The 1979 NFL Draft was the procedure by which National Football League teams selected amateur college football players. It is officially known as the NFL Annual Player Selection Meeting. The draft was held May 3–4, 1979, at the Waldorf Astoria Hotel in New York City, New York. The league also held a supplemental draft after the regular draft and before the regular season.

The Buffalo Bills held the first overall pick in the draft, acquired from the San Francisco 49ers in the trade which sent O. J. Simpson to his hometown team. The Bills' selection at No. 1, Ohio State linebacker Tom Cousineau, refused to sign with the Bills and instead inked a lucrative deal with the Montreal Alouettes of the Canadian Football League.

Player selections

Round one

Round two

Round three

Round four

Round five

Round six

Round seven

Round eight

Round nine

Round ten

Round eleven

Round twelve

Hall of Famers
 Kellen Winslow, tight end from Missouri, taken 1st round 13th overall by San Diego Chargers
Inducted: Professional Football Hall of Fame class of 1995.
 Joe Montana, quarterback from Notre Dame, taken 3rd round 82nd overall by San Francisco 49ers
Inducted: Professional Football Hall of Fame class of 2000.
 Dan Hampton, defensive tackle from Arkansas, taken 1st round 4th overall by Chicago Bears
Inducted: Professional Football Hall of Fame class of  2002.
 Bill Cowher, linebacker from North Carolina State, undrafted and signed by Philadelphia Eagles
Inducted: For his Coaching achievements Professional Football Hall of Fame Class of 2020.

Notable undrafted players

References

External links
 NFL.com – 1979 Draft
 databaseFootball.com – 1979 Draft
 Pro Football Hall of Fame
 1979 NFL Draft  Pick Transactions

National Football League Draft
NFL Draft
Draft
NFL Draft
NFL Draft
American football in New York City
1970s in Manhattan
Sporting events in New York City
Sports in Manhattan